Hurwitz is one of the variants of a surname of Ashkenazi Jewish origin (for historical background see the Horowitz page).
Notable people with the surname include:

Adolf Hurwitz (1859–1919), German mathematician
Hurwitz polynomial
Hurwitz matrix
Hurwitz quaternion
Hurwitz's automorphisms theorem
Hurwitz zeta function
Hurwitz's theorem (disambiguation) Five theorems named after Adolf Hurwitz
Routh–Hurwitz stability criterion
Andrew D. Hurwitz (born 1947), American judge
Edward Hurwitz (born 1931), American diplomat
Emanuel Hurwitz (1919–2006), British violinist
Gregg Hurwitz, American novelist
Henry Hurwitz Jr. (1918–1992), nuclear physicist
Hyman Hurwitz (1770–1844), professor of Hebrew in England
Jake Hurwitz (born 1985), American comedian, writer and actor known for Jake and Amir and CollegeHumor
Johanna Hurwitz (born 1937), American children's author, known for books such as Baseball Fever and Class Clown
Jon Hurwitz (born 1977), American screenwriter best known for Harold & Kumar Go to White Castle
Jonty Hurwitz (born 1969), electrical engineer and sculptor. Best known for his Nanoart and his contributions to the field of Anamorphosis.Justin Hurwitz (born 1985), American composer
Lazar Lipman Hurwitz (1815–1852), editor and writer
Leo Hurwitz (1909–1991), American documentary film maker who filmed the Eichmann trial
Moses ha-Levi Hurwitz (d. 1820), Lithuanian rabbi
Mitchell Hurwitz, American television writer and producer best known for his work on Arrested DevelopmentShelley Hurwitz, American biostatistician
T. Alan Hurwitz (born 1942), 10th president of Gallaudet University
William Hurwitz, American pain management physician
Yosef Yozel Horwitz (1849–1919), the Alter of NavordokZvi Harry Hurwitz, (1924–2008) Israeli diplomat, public servant and biographer

In fiction
Lieutenant Hurwitz, a minor character in the movie Airplane!''. A patient in a military hospital, he was suffering from "severe shell-shock," causing him to think he was Ethel Merman. Played by Merman herself, in her final screen appearance.

A variation of the name is Hurvitz, which may refer to:

Yair Hurvitz, Hebrew language poet.
Igael Hurvitz, Likud Knesset Member
Yigal Hurvitz, Israeli former finance minister

A variation of the name is Ish-Hurwitz, which may refer to:
Yoram Ish-Hurwitz, Dutch pianist
A variation of the name is Gurvitz, which may refer to:
Adrian Gurvitz, English singer-songwriter.
A variation of the name is Gurwits, which may refer to:
Eduard Gurwits, Ukrainian politician, Mayor of Odessa

See also 
Witold Hurewicz
J. C. Hurewitz
Horowitz
Horovitz
Horvitz
Horwitz
Hurwicz

Jewish surnames
Yiddish-language surnames